Diary of a Wimpy Kid: The Long Haul is a 2017 American road comedy film written and directed by David Bowers and co-written by the books' author Jeff Kinney. It serves as a sequel to Diary of a Wimpy Kid: Dog Days, and the fourth installment in the Diary of a Wimpy Kid film series and the final live-action film in the franchise. It was based on the ninth book of the same name, with elements of the seventh, eighth, and tenth books in the series. It is also the only live-action installment in the series not to feature the cast members from the first three films as they outgrew their roles. It instead features a completely different cast (which includes Jason Drucker, Alicia Silverstone, Tom Everett Scott, Charlie Wright, and Owen Asztalos), and the plot follows the Heffleys as they go on a road trip to Meemaw's 90th birthday party, without realizing the various calamities that will occur along the way.

After the release of Diary of a Wimpy Kid: Dog Days in 2012, the film was described as the last live-action one in the franchise, with the original cast and crew indicating that were no plans for a fourth film. By 2016, a live-action adaptation of the ninth book, The Long Haul, was in development, with the aforementioned new cast.

The Long Haul received negative reviews from critics and fans alike, and critics surveyed by Rotten Tomatoes called it "largely unfunny". The film was also a box office disappointment, only grossing $40 million worldwide against a $22 million budget.

The film would later be the last one in the series to be produced by 20th Century Fox before the studio was acquired by Disney in 2019 and the last one before the series was rebooted into animated films, starting with the 2021 Diary of a Wimpy Kid movie on Disney+.

Plot
The Heffley family dines at a restaurant called Corny’s, where Susan announces the family plan for a road trip to attend Meemaw’s 90th birthday party, much to Rodrick and Greg's dismay. Greg is then sent to rescue Manny from inside a tube in the play area. He ends up in the ball pit with a diaper stuck to his hand and freaking out while searching for Manny. He subsequently becomes famous when the footage is posted on the Internet, becoming an embarrassing meme called "Diaper Hands".

Later, Greg learns that the Player Expo is taking place not far from Meemaw's house in Indianapolis. His favorite Internet star, Mac Digby, will be attending so he plans to sneak off from the road trip and secretly go to the Player Expo. As soon as they start, everyone's phones are immediately confiscated by Susan, so the road trip is "absolutely technology-free".

That night, at a motel, Greg secretly gets his phone from the car. Later, while he and Rodrick are relaxing in the hot tub, Rodrick uncovers his plans to go to the Player Expo, but Greg convinces him not to tell Susan, and opts to go with him.  Later that night, Greg investigates a loud noise: a couple of kids repeatedly slamming a wheeled cart into a wall, belonging to a family which he dubs "the Beardos" due to their father's beard. Scolding them for making a racket, he threatens to have them thrown out. Their father comes out, and nearly gets hit by the cart his daughter rolls at Greg, but it misses him and damages their van. She blames Greg, telling her father that he also called him a "Fat Beardo," causing Mr. Beardo to plot revenge.

On the road, Manny wins a piglet at a fair. Mr. Beardo, who is also there with his family, sees Greg and pursues him. The next day, a work call and the piglet's craziness lead to the Heffleys nearly crashing their car on a bridge, and they donate the piglet to a petting zoo much to Manny's dismay while Greg reroutes the GPS to the Player Expo. In the hotel room, Rodrick and Greg leave a note telling Frank and Susan that they are buying a gift for Meemaw, but they sneak out to Player Expo. Thinking they are missing, Susan calls the police but gets them herself after seeing them on TV.

Seeing Mac Digby in a video game competition, Greg asks Rodrick to record him on the stage behind him, but he accidentally knocks out the power to Mac's screen. Susan arrives and accidentally reveals to Mac that Greg is Diaper Hands, humiliating him in the process. She opens up saying all she wanted was a nice road trip to bring them closer together, and accuses him of not caring. Fed up of her being controlling, he calls her out on her hypocrisy and naiveté. Finally feeling defeated, she gives him back his phone.

Back on the road, the tarp on their motorboat blows open and their belongings fly out. The Beardos then show up and begin stealing them as "payback." The Heffleys chase after the Beardos, but get stuck in a traffic jam, which they get out of by taking a back road. They come across the Beardos' van at another motel, steal their belongings back, and manage to reach Meemaw's birthday celebration with Greg in the boat with it detached to the car. After the party, the car breaks down again, though a tow truck driver stops by, but he only speaks Spanish, though Manny is able to communicate due to a CD they heard earlier in the trip. He guides them to the petting zoo and he retrieves the piglet.
In Greg's ending monologue, Frank gets time off from work to spend with his family, and Rodrick gets money to repair his van. While the trip was far hardly perfect, it was eventful and he's excited for next year. Susan steps in to say that they will be flying to their next holiday, wherever they go. 

In a mid-credits scene, two girls take selfies with Greg, who they recognize as "diaper hands".

Cast

 Jason Drucker as Greg Heffley, Susan and Frank's son
 Alicia Silverstone as Susan Heffley, Greg's mother
 Tom Everett Scott as Frank Heffley, Greg's father
 Charlie Wright as Rodrick Heffley, Greg's older brother
 Owen Asztalos as Rowley Jefferson, Greg's best friend
 Dylan and Wyatt Walters as Manny Heffley, Greg's younger brother
 Joshua Hoover as Mac Digby
 Christopher A. Coppola as Mr. Beardo
 Kimberli Lincoln as Mrs. Beardo
 Mira Silverman as Brandi Beardo
 Mimi Gould as Meemaw
 Nathaniel Dickson as Brandon Beardo
 Jake Strerner as Brent Beardo

The series' author, Jeff Kinney, makes his third cameo role, this time as a booth owner at the Player Expo.

Production

In 2012, the series' third entry, Diary of a Wimpy Kid: Dog Days was described as the last live action film in the franchise. That same year in August, while doing press for the film, author Jeff Kinney and actors Zachary Gordon and Robert Capron each indicated that there were no plans for a fourth movie, but did not dismiss the possibility entirely.

In 2014, Jeff Kinney replied to inquiries regarding the possibility of another sequel in a YouTube video, stating, "At present, we don't have a fourth film in development, but you never know!" When describing the likelihood of starring in another film in the series, Gordon explained, "Dog Days most likely will be the last movie. The main problem is [the cast] is getting older. You can't stop it. There's no way to temporarily stop us from changing and growing up. You know, that's the problem because the characters are supposed to be timeless."

In March 2013, Gordon stated in a Spreecast live stream that there would not be a fourth live action film. Previously, Kinney had indicated that instead of making a live action film, he would like to see Diary of a Wimpy Kid: Cabin Fever adapted into an animated film, stating in an interview, "I hope that it gets made into an animated movie. But I'd really like to see it turn into an animated television special."

In 2016, it was announced that a live-action film adaptation of the ninth book The Long Haul was in development, and would be featuring a completely new cast playing the Heffleys.

Release

Theatrical
The film was released on May 17, 2017, in the Philippines, two days later on May 19 in the United States, and on May 26 in the United Kingdom.

Home media 
The film was released on Digital HD from Amazon Video and iTunes on August 1, 2017, and on Blu-ray and DVD on August 8, 2017, by 20th Century Fox Home Entertainment. It grossed $2.6 million in home video sales.

Reception

Box office
The film grossed $20.7 million in the United States and Canada and $19.3 million in other countries for a worldwide total of $40.1 million, against a production budget of $22 million. It was the lowest-grossing film of the Diary of a Wimpy Kid series by a wide margin.

In North America, the film was initially projected to gross around $12 million from 3,129 theaters during its opening weekend. However, after grossing $2 million on its first day, projections were lowered to $7 million. It ended up finishing with $7.1 million, placing 6th at the box office and marking the lowest opening of the franchise by a wide margin.

When the film was released in the United Kingdom, it opened at #2, behind Pirates of the Caribbean: Dead Men Tell No Tales with £1,444,092. The film was a box disappointment, grossing just $40.1 million worldwide.

Critical response
On Rotten Tomatoes, the film has an approval rating of 17% based on 72 reviews and an average rating of 4.2/10. The site's critical consensus reads, "With an all-new cast but the same juvenile humor, Diary of a Wimpy Kid: The Long Haul finds the franchise still stuck in arrested – and largely unfunny – development." On Metacritic, it has a score of 39 out of 100 based on 16 critics, indicating "generally unfavorable reviews". Audiences polled by CinemaScore gave it an average grade of "B" on an A+ to F scale, down from the first three films' "A−".

Dennis Harvey of Variety was more positive, calling the film "an amiable, fast-paced entry that should win over fans." Jesse Hassenger of The A.V. Club called the film "repetitive and uninspired". Christy Lemire of RogerEbert.com criticized it, saying it "Jettisons everything that’s honest and worthwhile about the books in favor of hackneyed misadventures and gross-out scatological humor." Jody Mitori of the St. Louis Post-Dispatch gave The Long Haul two stars out of four and commented on its increase of gross-out humor compared to the book version and previous films. Linda Cook of The Quad City Times called it the worst film of the year so far.

Reboot

Following the release of Diary of a Wimpy Kid: Dog Days, the likelihood of a fourth live-action film was slim. In 2012, Jeff Kinney, the author of the Diary of a Wimpy Kid books, had announced the possibility for an animated film to be based on Diary of a Wimpy Kid: Cabin Fever as the next installment. In an interview for Diary of a Wimpy Kid: Hard Luck, Kinney stated he was working with Fox on a half-hour special based on Cabin Fever, which was to be aired in late 2014, but as of 2022, it never came into fruition. In August 2018, CEO of 20th Century Fox Stacey Snider announced that a fully animated television series based on Diary of a Wimpy Kid was in development. On August 6, 2019, after the acquisition of 21st Century Fox by Disney, the project was confirmed to be still in development for the then-upcoming Disney+.

In December 2020, the project was confirmed to have been redeveloped as an animated film titled Diary of a Wimpy Kid, with production already started and with a release year of 2021. On September 2, 2021, it was announced that the film would be released on December 3, 2021, confirmed to simply be titled Diary of a Wimpy Kid, and it would be a retelling of the first book in the series. Swinton Scott was announced as director, and Kinney as producer and writer. Brady Noon, Ethan William Childress, and Chris Diamantopoulos were also announced to be part of the voice cast. Noon voiced Greg, Childress voiced Rowley, and Diamantopoulos voiced Greg's father Frank.
Erica Cerra, Hunter Dillon and Gracen Newton later joined the voice cast of the film. Cerra voiced Greg's mother Susan, while Dillon and Newton voiced Greg's brothers Rodrick and Manny.

References

External links

 
 Diary of a Wimpy Kid: The Long Haul at AllMovie
 
 Diary of a Wimpy Kid: The Long Haul at the TCM Movie Database

2017 films
2010s children's comedy films
2010s English-language films
American films with live action and animation
American sequel films
American children's comedy films
American comedy road movies
Casting controversies in film
Films about families
Films about vacationing
Diary of a Wimpy Kid (film series)
20th Century Fox films
Films directed by David Bowers
Films scored by Edward Shearmur
2017 comedy films
2010s comedy road movies
Films shot in Georgia (U.S. state)
Films shot in Indiana
Films set in Indiana
Films set in Indianapolis
Films shot in Vancouver
TSG Entertainment films
2010s American films